Villar de Chinchilla is a village in Albacete, Castile-La Mancha, Spain.

Populated places in the Province of Albacete